The Pfalz Dr.I was a German fighter prototype of World War I. Official interest in the potential of the triplane configuration for single-seat fighters prompted Pfalz to develop the Dr.I. It underwent initial testing in October 1917, and an initial batch of 10 aircraft were shipped to the Front and arrived in April 1918.

Operational history
Service pilots involved in testing the Dr.I considered it too slow and its Sh III engine too unreliable for frontline use and no further examples were produced. Jasta 73 was equipped with this aircraft in 1918.

List of operators

Luftstreitkrafte

Specifications

References

Further reading

 

1910s German fighter aircraft
Dr.I
Triplanes
Rotary-engined aircraft
Aircraft first flown in 1917